Darko Zakoč (born 24 May 1963) is a Serbian volleyball coach. He has been coaching Romanian side CSM Volei Alba Blaj since 2014.

Zakoč coached the Serbia and Montenegro women's national team between 1996 and 2001. He was then manager of the Romanian women's national team from 2010 to 2012.   

He was given the award of Cetățean de onoare ("Honorary Citizen") of the city of Blaj in 2017.

In May 2018, Darko Zakoč led CSM Volei Alba Blaj to runner-up finish at CEV Champions League finals.

Honours   

CSM Volei Alba Blaj
 Romanian Division: 2015, 2016, 2017

Partizan Vizura
 Serbian League: 2014

2004 Tomis Constanța
 Romanian Division: 2011, 2012

Poštar 064 Beograd
 Serbian League: 2006, 2007, 2008, 2009

Jedinstvo Užice
 Serbian League: 1994, 1995, 1996, 1997, 1998, 1999, 2000, 2001

References

1963 births
Sportspeople from Užice
Serbian volleyball coaches
Volleyball coaches of international teams 
Serbian expatriate sportspeople in Italy
Serbian expatriate sportspeople in Romania
Living people